Automatic Colt Pistol (ACP) denotes various John Moses Browning cartridge designs primarily used in Colt and Fabrique Nationale de Herstal semi-automatic pistols. All of these cartridges are straight-sided and appear similar. The .32 ACP, .38 ACP, and .25 ACP are semi-rimmed and headspace on the rim, while the rimless .45 ACP and .380 ACP headspace on the mouth of the case.

ACP cartridges

 .32 ACP (7.65×17mmSR) – 1899
 .38 ACP (9×23mmSR) – 1900
 .25 ACP (6.35×16mmSR) – 1905
 .45 ACP (11.43×23mm) – 1905
 .380 ACP (9x17mm) – 1908

History
Colt has manufactured several self-loading pistols. The first was the Colt M1900 made from 1900 to 1902 exclusively for the .38 ACP. The Colt Model 1903 Pocket Hammer was manufactured for the same .38 ACP cartridge from 1902 to 1928. The M1905 military pistol was manufactured for the .45 ACP cartridge from 1905 to 1912. The M1905 was replaced by the military M1911 pistol which remained in production until 1970. The Colt Model 1903 Pocket Hammerless pistol was manufactured for the .32 ACP from 1903 to 1941 and as the Model 1908 for the .380 ACP from 1908 to 1941. The Colt Model 1908 Vest Pocket pistol was manufactured for the .25 ACP from 1908 to 1941.

See also
9mm Browning Long
List of handgun cartridges

References

Cartridge families